Michael Richard Brennan (born May 18, 1972) is a college basketball head coach who most recently served as head coach of American University and former professional European basketball player who played for teams in Germany, Belgium and Portugal. He previously served as an assistant coach for Columbia University, Georgetown University, Princeton University and American University. Brennan also holds an Irish passport.

Playing career 
Brennan won two Ivy League titles with the Princeton Tigers men's basketball. He played for the Tigers between 1990 and 1994, averaging 5.0 points, 2.4 rebounds and 1.7 assists per game. Professionally, he spent time in the German Basketball Bundesliga (at Bayer Leverkusen in 1996–97 and Braunschweig in 1997–98), Belgium (at Pepinster in 1998–99) and Portugal.

Assistant coaching career
Brennan was a volunteer assistant coach at Columbia University for one year then served as an assistant coach for Princeton University from 2000 to 2007. After being the assistant coach of Princeton, he became the assistant coach of AU from 2007 to 2009. The next four years he served as an assistant coach for Georgetown University. His overall record as an assistant coach was 252–163.

Head coaching career
Brennan was named the head coach of AU in April 2013.  In his first season with the Eagles, Brennan led them to a second place regular-season finish in the Patriot League, a Championship in the Patriot League Tournament, and a bid to the 2014 NCAA Tournament after being picked to finish just ninth in the Patriot League in the preseason poll. He was named 2014 Patriot League Coach of the Year based on this turnaround.

Head coaching record

References

1972 births
Living people
American Eagles men's basketball coaches
American expatriate basketball people in Belgium
American expatriate basketball people in Germany
American expatriate basketball people in Portugal
American men's basketball coaches
American men's basketball players
Basketball Löwen Braunschweig players
Bayer Giants Leverkusen players
College men's basketball head coaches in the United States
Columbia Lions men's basketball coaches
Georgetown Hoyas men's basketball coaches
Guards (basketball)
Princeton Tigers men's basketball coaches
Princeton Tigers men's basketball players
RBC Pepinster players